Kraft Music Hall is an umbrella title for several television series aired by NBC in the United States from the 1950s to the 1970s in the musical variety genre, sponsored by Kraft Foods, the producers of a well-known line of cheeses and related dairy products. Their commercials were usually announced by "The Voice of Kraft", Ed Herlihy.

Original

The original Kraft Music Hall was a radio series that aired from 1933 to 1949. It was one of the most popular programs of its type, particularly during the period (1936–1946) when it was hosted by Bing Crosby, then by Al Jolson (1947-1949). However, unlike similar programs, it did not make the transition directly to network television; Kraft's early ventures into that field entailed the sponsorship of a famed series of dramas, initially broadcast live, under the title Kraft Television Theatre.

1950s
By 1958, Kraft was prepared to revive the Music Hall for television. The first host was "Mr. Television", Milton Berle, who had become television's first superstar by hosting earlier NBC programs, the Texaco Star Theater and The Buick-Berle Show. An alternate summer host in the program's early period was the English comedian and singer Dave King. The program achieved its greatest success hosted by Perry Como between 1959 and 1967.

1960s

Beginning in 1963, Kraft Music Hall specials hosted by Como were presented about once a month, through 1967. During the 1963-64 and 1964-65 television seasons, Kraft Suspense Theatre (co-produced by Como's "Roncom Films") was broadcast in the same time slot during the remaining weeks.

In 1966, the program was a summer replacement for The Andy Williams Show, known as the Kraft Summer Music Hall, with singer John Davidson as the host. Comedian George Carlin was a featured regular.

In the fall of 1967, the Kraft Music Hall returned as a weekly series, but without Perry Como who abruptly ended his association with Kraft Foods after the 1966-67 season. A format of rotating guest hosts was implemented, employing some of the leading figures in the U.S. entertainment industry at the time, including Rock Hudson, Lorne Greene, George Burns, Dinah Shore and Woody Allen. In 1968, the practice of regular hosts was reinstated, with programs starring, in succession, country singer Eddy Arnold, John Davidson (again) and Ed McMahon. Arnold's programs all featured an appearance by comedian/impressionist John Byner, and Mark Andrews.

Other leading performers who appeared on the Kraft Music Hall on a reasonably frequent basis were Don Rickles, Alan King, Steve Lawrence and Eydie Gorme, Mitzi Gaynor, Bobby Darin, Pierre Olaf, Roy Rogers and Dale Evans, Wayne Newton, Johnny Cash and Simon & Garfunkel.

Taping
The series in the late 1960s and early 1970s was recorded at the NBC studio in Midwood, Brooklyn, New York, at Avenue M and East 14th Street. A show with Rickles was partly taped on Avenue M and the Avenue M station of the BMT subway line, less than two blocks away.

Country Music Association Awards and Friars Club' roasts
The 1968 telecast of the Country Music Association Awards (the first installment of the CMA Awards to be televised) was presented as an episode of the Kraft Music Hall, as were the earliest telecasts of the Friars' Club roasts, which later became a regular feature of The Dean Martin Show.

Summer hosts
Summer hosts during this late period of the show included Britons. 
In the summer of 1969 - from May 14 till Aug 13th - Tony Sandler and Ralph Young, a.k.a. Sandler and Young hosted the NBC show for 13 weeks from London.

Some other programs that summer were hosted by Don Ho and Des O'Connor in 1970 and 1971; the Des O'Connor shows were originally broadcast in the United Kingdom on ITV as the seventh series (seventh season) of The Des O'Connor Show, which ran from 1963 to 1973.

Constants
Despite the variety of casts and formats employed by the program over the years, there were some constants as well. Longtime Kraft announcer Herlihy voiced all but the summer programs, and the Peter Matz orchestra provided most of the music and, again with the exception of the summer shows, Peter Gennaro was the choreographer.

References
Brooks, Tim and Marsh, Earle, The Complete Directory to Prime Time Network and Cable TV Shows

External links
  
 

1958 American television series debuts
1971 American television series endings
1950s American music television series
1960s American music television series
1970s American music television series
1950s American variety television series
1960s American variety television series
1970s American variety television series
English-language television shows
NBC original programming
Roast (comedy)
Kraft Foods
Television shows filmed in New York (state)